Kharchakund is a mountain of the Garhwal Himalaya in Uttarakhand, India. It is 64th highest located entirely within the Uttrakhand. Nanda Devi, is the highest mountain in this category. It is surrounded by Gangotri Glacier and Ghanoim Bamak. Its nearest higher neighbor Kedarnath Dome  lies 6.4 km WNW. It is located 1.2 km NNE of Sumeru Parbat  and 10.7 km east lies Janhukut .

Climbing history
On 29 May 1980 a Japanese team climbed Kharchakund. The first summiteers of this mountain are Yoshitaka Tanimura and Toshiharu Hashimoto. They climbed Kharchakund from the west ridge a side ridge of the north ridge. On 30 May the second party also reached the summit they are Sueo Miyahara, Kaoru Ueno, Yoshiki Yamanaka and Masao Mizuno. They established three camps in between the summit. Camp 1 at a height of 4900m, camp 2 at 5300m and camp 3 at 6000m.
A four-man team of the Oread Mountaineering Club, Robin Beadle, Bobby Gilbert, Rob Tresidder and Pete Scott climbed Kharchakund on 18 September 1987. They planned an alpine-style ascent of Kharcha Kund's N ridge. They made six bivouacs between 5000m and 6000m before their summit day.

Glaciers and rivers

Gangotri Glacier lies from the northern side to eastern side of Kharchakund. On the western side lies Ghanohim Bamak and on the south east lies Yeonbuk Bamak. Yeonbuk and Ghanoim both these glacier joins Gangotri glacier. From the snout of Gangotri Glacier comes out Bhagirathi River one of the main tributaries of river Ganga. which later joins Alaknanda river the other main tributaries of river Ganga at Dev Prayag and became Ganga there after.

Neighboring peaks
neighboring peaks of Kharchakund: 
 Chaukhamba I: 
 Bhagirathi I: 
 Kedarnath Peak: 
 Kedarnath Dome: 
 Sumeru Parbat: 
 Mandani Parbat: 
 Kirti Stambh:

See also

 List of Himalayan peaks of Uttarakhand

References

Mountains of Uttarakhand
Six-thousanders of the Himalayas
Geography of Chamoli district